Fishing: Barents Sea is a commercial fishing simulation video game developed by Misc Games, released on Microsoft Windows. It is the first title available on Steam to be released by Misc Games, a video game developer based in Stavanger, Norway.

Reception 
According to review aggregator Metacritic, Fishing: Barents Sea has received mixed reviews and has a score of 69.

References

External links

2018 video games
Fishing video games
Video games set in Norway
Video games developed in Norway
Windows games
Windows-only games
Unreal Engine games
Single-player video games